William Macdonald or MacDonald or McDonald may refer to:

Politicians
 William McDonald (Canadian politician) (1837–1916), from Nova Scotia
 William Alexander Macdonald (1860–1946), Canadian politician; from Manitoba
 William Archibald Macdonald (1841–1911), Irish nationalist politician and MP
 William C. McDonald (governor) (1858–1918), American politician; Governor of New Mexico
 William Chisholm Macdonald (1890–1946), Liberal Party member of the Canadian House of Commons
 William MacDonald (New Zealand politician) (1862–1920), cabinet minister and briefly Leader of the Opposition
 William H. McDonald (1899–1967), American politician; Texas Land Commissioner
 William John Macdonald (1832–1916), Canadian merchant and politician
 William Josiah MacDonald (1873–1946), American politician; from Michigan
 William Madison McDonald (1866–1950), African-American politician and businessman
 William Ross Macdonald (1891–1976), Canadian lawyer and statesman; from Ontario
 William Walter McDonald (1844–1929), Canadian politician; from the Northwest Territories
 William McDonald (Australian politician) (1911–1995), Speaker of the Victorian Legislative Assembly

Academics
 William MacDonald (Christian author) (1917–2007), American Plymouth Brethren scholar and theologian; former President of Emmaus Bible College
 William Macdonald (historian) (1863–1938), American journalist and historian
 William Andrew McDonald (1913–2000), American archaeologist
 William Bell Macdonald (1807–1862), Scottish linguist
 William L. MacDonald (1921–2010), American historian of Roman architecture

Religious figures
 William Macdonald (priest) (1783–1862), British; Archdeacon of Wilts
 William Joseph McDonald (1904–1989), Irish-born bishop of the Catholic Church in the United States

Sports
 William MacDonald (footballer) (1911–1978), Scottish footballer and Royal Navy officer
 William Macdonald (jockey) (1800–1856), British; winner of the 1840 Epsom Derby
 William McDonald (bowls) (1885–?), Canadian lawn bowls international

Others
 William MacDonald (RAF officer) (1908–1984), British air marshal
 William MacDonald (serial killer) (1924–2015), Australian serial murderer
 William Christopher Macdonald (1831–1917), Canadian tobacco manufacturer and philanthropist
 William Colt MacDonald (1891–1968), American writer of Westerns
 William J. MacDonald (filmmaker) (born 20th century), American film and television producer
 William Johnson McDonald (1844–1926), American banker; endowed an astronomical observatory
 William Myron MacDonald (1890–1958), American-born Canadian flying ace
 William Sutherland Macdonald (1897–1990), Scottish physician; principal medical officer at the Ministry of Health
 William W. McDonald (born 20th century), American rancher and conservationist
 William Hixon McDonald (junior) (1840–1898), Australian miner, political candidate and pioneer
 William Hixon McDonald (senior) (c. 1815–1869), Australian soldier-settler and gold miner
 William Rae Macdonald (1843–1923), Scottish officer of arms

See also
 Bill McDonald (disambiguation)
 Bill MacDonald (disambiguation)
 Bill Macdonald, American sportscaster
 Will McDonald (born 1979), American basketball player
 Will McDonald (journalist) (born 1979), Australian television journalist
 Willie McDonald (1905–1979), Scottish footballer
 Willie McDonald (footballer, born 1883) (1883–after 1914), Scottish footballer
 George William McDonald (1875–1950), politician in Manitoba, Canada